The 1994–95 NBA season was the 25th season for the Portland Trail Blazers in the National Basketball Association. The Blazers 25th season was marked by change as they played their final season at the Memorial Coliseum with new head coach P.J. Carlesimo. The Blazers started their season defeating the Los Angeles Clippers in their first two games, which were played in Yokohama, Japan. The team got off to a 6–6 start, and played around .500 for the first half of the season, holding a 25–20 record at the All-Star break, as Terry Porter only played just 35 games due to an ankle injury. 

Clyde Drexler averaged 22.0 points per game for the first half of the season, but was not selected for the All-Star Game. On February 14, 1995, with the Blazers out of serious contention for the championship, the team honored Drexler's request to be traded to a contender, sending him along with Tracy Murray to the defending NBA champion Houston Rockets in exchange for forward Otis Thorpe. The Rockets went on to win their second straight title defeating the Orlando Magic in four straight games, and Drexler's first ever championship.

The Blazers finished the season with a 44–38 record, fourth in the Pacific Division and seventh in the Western Conference. It was their 13th straight trip to the postseason. Clifford Robinson averaged 21.3 points and 5.6 rebounds per game, while Rod Strickland averaged 18.9 points, 8.8 assists and 1.9 steals per game, and Thorpe played a sixth man role, averaging 13.5 points and 6.9 rebounds per game off the bench in 34 games with the Blazers. In addition, Buck Williams averaged 9.2 points and 8.2 rebounds per game, and Chris Dudley led the team with 9.3 rebounds and 1.5 blocks per game. Off the bench, Harvey Grant provided the team with 9.1 points per game, while Porter contributed 8.9 points and 3.8 assists per game, second-year guard James Robinson provided with 9.2 points per game, and Jerome Kersey contributed 8.1 points per game.

However, in the playoffs, the Blazers were swept in the Western Conference First Round by a 0–3 margin against the Phoenix Suns. Following the season, Thorpe was traded to the Detroit Pistons, while Porter signed as a free agent with the Minnesota Timberwolves, Kersey left in the 1995 NBA Expansion Draft, and Mark Bryant signed with the Houston Rockets.

Draft picks

Roster

Regular season

Season standings

z – clinched division title
y – clinched division title
x – clinched playoff spot

Record vs. opponents

Game log

|- align="center" bgcolor="#ccffcc"
| 8
| November 22, 19945:30p.m. PST
| @ Houston
| W 102–94
| Drexler (30)
| Robinson (13)
| Robinson (9)
| The Summit16,611
| 5–3

|- align="center" bgcolor="#ccffcc"
| 44
| February 6, 19957:00p.m. PST
| Houston
| W 120–82
| Robinson (20)
| Kersey (14)
| Drexler (7)
| Memorial Coliseum12,888
| 24–20
|- align="center"
|colspan="9" bgcolor="#bbcaff"|All-Star Break
|- style="background:#cfc;"
|- bgcolor="#bbffbb"

|- align="center" bgcolor="#ccffcc"
| 73
| April 7, 19957:00p.m. PDT
| Houston
| W 127–109
| Strickland (27)
| Robinson (8)
| Strickland (10)
| Memorial Coliseum12,888
| 39–34
|- align="center" bgcolor="#ffcccc"
| 76
| April 13, 19955:30p.m. PDT
| @ Houston
| L 99–112
| Strickland (22)
| Thorpe (14)
| Strickland (5)
| The Summit16,611
| 40–36

Playoffs

|- align="center" bgcolor="#ffcccc"
| 1
| April 28
| @ Phoenix
| L 102–129
| Rod Strickland (23)
| Grant, Dudley (7)
| Rod Strickland (13)
| America West Arena19,023
| 0–1
|- align="center" bgcolor="#ffcccc"
| 2
| April 30
| @ Phoenix
| L 94–103
| Rod Strickland (26)
| Buck Williams (7)
| Rod Strickland (12)
| America West Arena19,023
| 0–2
|- align="center" bgcolor="#ffcccc"
| 3
| May 2
| Phoenix
| L 109–117
| Rod Strickland (21)
| Clifford Robinson (10)
| Rod Strickland (12)
| Memorial Coliseum12,888
| 0–3
|-

Player statistics

Season
{| class="wikitable sortable" style="font-size: 90%"
|-
! style="background:#000000; color:#BE0032" width="10%" | Player
! style="background:#000000; color:#BE0032" width="6%" | GP
! style="background:#000000; color:#BE0032" width="6%" | GS
! style="background:#000000; color:#BE0032" width="6%" | MPG
! style="background:#000000; color:#BE0032" width="6%" | FG%
! style="background:#000000; color:#BE0032" width="6%" | 3FG%
! style="background:#000000; color:#BE0032" width="6%" | FT%
! style="background:#000000; color:#BE0032" width="6%" | RPG
! style="background:#000000; color:#BE0032" width="6%" | APG
! style="background:#000000; color:#BE0032" width="6%" | SPG
! style="background:#000000; color:#BE0032" width="6%" | BPG
! style="background:#000000; color:#BE0032" width="6%" | PPG
|-
|  || 49 || 0 || 13.4 || .526 || .500 || .651 || 3.3 || .6 || .4 || .3 || 5.0
|-
|  || 41 || 41 || 34.8 || .428 || .363 || .835 || 5.7 || 5.1 || 1.8 || .5 || 22.0
|-
|  || 82 || 82 || 27.4 || .406 || .000 || .464 || 9.3 || .4 || .5 || 1.5 || 5.5
|-
|  || 28 || 0 || 9.5 || .386 || .000 || .647 || 1.5 || .3 || .2 || .3 || 2.7
|-
|  || 75 || 14 || 23.6 || .461 || .308 || .705 || 3.8 || 1.1 || .7 || .7 || 9.1
|-
|  || 37 || 0 || 10.3 || .430 || .442 || .880 || .7 || 2.3 || .2 || .0 || 3.2
|-
|  || 63 || 0 || 18.1 || .415 || .259 || .766 || 4.1 || 1.3 || .8 || .6 || 8.1
|-
|  || 45 || 20 || 18.4 || .444 || .393 || .685 || 2.9 || 2.0 || .8 || .4 || 6.5
|-
|  || 29 || 3 || 10.8 || .412 || .390 || .824 || 1.3 || .5 || .2 || .0 || 5.9
|-
|  || 35 || 9 || 22.0 || .393 || .386 || .707 || 2.3 || 3.8 || .9 || .1 || 8.9
|-
|  || 75 || 73 || 36.3 || .452 || .371 || .694 || 5.6 || 2.6 || 1.1 || 1.1 || 21.3
|-
|  || 71 || 25 || 21.7 || .409 || .341 || .591 || 1.9 || 2.5 || .7 || .2 || 9.2
|-
|  || 64 || 61 || 35.4 || .466 || .374 || .745 || 5.0 || 8.8 || 1.9 || .1 || 18.9
|-
|  || 34 || 0 || 26.7 || .568 || .000 || .649 || 6.9 || 1.6 || .6 || .4 || 13.5
|-
|  || 82 || 82 || 29.5 || .512 || .500 || .673 || 8.2 || 1.0 || .8 || .8 || 9.2

Playoffs
{| class="wikitable sortable" style="font-size: 90%"
|-
! style="background:#000000; color:#BE0032" width="10%" | Player
! style="background:#000000; color:#BE0032" width="6%" | GP
! style="background:#000000; color:#BE0032" width="6%" | GS
! style="background:#000000; color:#BE0032" width="6%" | MPG
! style="background:#000000; color:#BE0032" width="6%" | FG%
! style="background:#000000; color:#BE0032" width="6%" | 3FG%
! style="background:#000000; color:#BE0032" width="6%" | FT%
! style="background:#000000; color:#BE0032" width="6%" | RPG
! style="background:#000000; color:#BE0032" width="6%" | APG
! style="background:#000000; color:#BE0032" width="6%" | SPG
! style="background:#000000; color:#BE0032" width="6%" | BPG
! style="background:#000000; color:#BE0032" width="6%" | PPG
|-
|  || 2 || 0 || 3.0 || .500 || .000 || .000 || 1.0 || .0 || .0 || .0 || 1.0
|-
|  || 3 || 3 || 19.7 || .667 || .000 || .375 || 5.0 || .3 || .0 || .3 || 2.3
|-
|  || 1 || 0 || 4.0 || .000 || .000 || .000 || .0 || .0 || .0 || .0 || .0
|-
|  || 3 || 3 || 38.3 || .500 || .556 || .625 || 5.3 || 2.0 || 1.0 || .7 || 14.3
|-
|  || 3 || 0 || 21.0 || .571 || .000 || .667 || 2.7 || 1.0 || 1.0 || .3 || 12.7
|-
|  || 3 || 0 || 11.3 || .571 || .500 || .000 || .7 || .3 || 1.0 || .0 || 5.7
|-
|  || 3 || 0 || 7.0 || .538 || .400 || .600 || .7 || 1.3 || .0 || .0 || 6.3
|-
|  || 3 || 3 || 39.7 || .362 || .235 || 563 || 6.3 || 2.7 || .7 || .3 || 15.7
|-
|  || 2 || 0 || 2.0 || .667 || .667 || .000 || .0 || .5 || .0 || .0 || 3.0
|-
|  || 3 || 3 || 42.0 || .415 || .400 || .778 || 4.0 || 12.3 || 1.0 || .7 || 23.3
|-
|  || 3 || 0 || 22.0 || .571 || .000 || .700 || 4.3 || .7 || .0 || .0 || 10.3
|-
|  || 3 || 3 || 34.3 || .600 || .000 || .636 || 6.3 || .3 || 1.3 || .7 || 8.3

Awards and records
The Trail Blazers did not win any awards for the 1994–95 season.

Transactions

Trades

Free agents

Player Transactions Citation:

References

Portland Trail Blazers seasons
Portland Trail Blazers 1994
Portland Trail Blazers 1994
Port
Port
Port